Darryl L. Gray (born 29 December 1946 in Campbellton, New Brunswick) was a Progressive Conservative member of the House of Commons of Canada. He was a farmer and professor by career.

He represented the Quebec riding of Bonaventure—Îles-de-la-Madeleine, where he was first elected in the 1984 federal election and re-elected in 1988, therefore becoming a member in the 33rd and 34th Canadian Parliaments.

External links
 

1946 births
Living people
Members of the House of Commons of Canada from Quebec
People from Campbellton, New Brunswick
Progressive Conservative Party of Canada MPs
Conservative Party of Canada candidates for the Canadian House of Commons